WUDR (98.1/99.5 FM) is a non-commercial, college radio station located on the campus of the University of Dayton in Dayton, Ohio.

Translators
In addition to the main station, WUDR is relayed by an additional translator to widen its broadcast area.
It is also home of The O'Donnell Factor, the University of Dayton's #1 hit radio show.

External links

WUDR webstream

University of Dayton
UDR
UDR
Radio stations established in 1970
1970 establishments in Ohio